Halorubrum coriense is a halophilic Archaeon in the family of Halorubraceae.

References

Euryarchaeota
Archaea described in 1996